Arne O. Holm (born 20 October 1956) is a Norwegian journalist and newspaper editor. He was born in Tromsø. He has been journalist for the newspapers Dagbladet and Dagens Næringsliv, and for NRK's Brennpunkt. He was awarded the SKUP Award in 1992. He was chief editor of Svalbardposten from 1997 to 1999.

Selected works
Everest. Den tunge veien (co-writer), 1995
Fra sort kull til varme bad (co-writer), 2000
Ja, vi elsker Se og hør, 2007

References

1956 births
Living people
People from Tromsø
People from Bodø
Dagbladet people
Norwegian investigative journalists
Norwegian newspaper editors